Ryan Dixon (born 2 December 1978) is a Norfolk Island international lawn bowler.

Biography
He was born in Gosford, New South Wales and was selected as part of the Norfolk Island team for the 2018 Commonwealth Games on the Gold Coast in Queensland where he took a bronze medal in the Triples with Phil Jones and Hadyn Evans.

In 2020 he was selected for the 2020 World Outdoor Bowls Championship in Australia. In 2022, he competed in the men's singles and the men's triples at the 2022 Commonwealth Games.

References

1978 births
Living people
Bowls players at the 2018 Commonwealth Games
Bowls players at the 2022 Commonwealth Games
Commonwealth Games medallists in lawn bowls
Norfolk Island sportspeople
Australian male bowls players
Commonwealth Games bronze medallists for Norfolk Island
Norfolk Island bowls players
People from Gosford
Sportsmen from New South Wales
Medallists at the 2018 Commonwealth Games